Roztoka  is a village in the administrative district of Gmina Żmudź, within Chełm County, Lublin Voivodeship, in eastern Poland.

The village has a population of 104.

References

Villages in Chełm County